Hemnskjela (sometimes Hemnskjel) is an island in the municipality of Hitra in Trøndelag county, Norway.

The southern entrance to the Hitra Tunnel is located on the island of Hemnskjela. The tunnel connects the village of Sandstad on the island of Hitra to Hemnskjela (underneath the Trondheimsleia). Then, the Hemnskjel bridge connects the island of Hemnskjela to the mainland part of Hitra.

See also
List of islands of Norway

References

Islands of Trøndelag
Hitra